Kayalar, is a village in the Midyat District of Mardin Province in Turkey. The village is populated by the Mhallami and had a population of 129 in 2021.

References 

Villages in Midyat District
Mhallami villages